Palmeirópolis is a municipality in Tocantins, North Region, Brazil.

See also
List of municipalities in Tocantins

References

Municipalities in Tocantins